Stoebe is a genus of African plants in the tribe Gnaphalieae within the family Asteraceae.

 Species

 formerly included
A few dozen species now regarded as members of other genera: Dicerothamnus Dolichothrix Disparago Gongyloglossa Helichrysum Metalasia Myrovernix Seriphium Trichogyne

References

Gnaphalieae
Flora of Africa
Asteraceae genera